Poděbrady is a spa town in Nymburk District in the Central Bohemian Region of the Czech Republic. It has about 14,000 inhabitants. It lies on the river Elbe. The town centre is well preserved and is protected by law as an urban monument zone.

Administrative parts

Poděbrady is made up of town parts of Poděbrady I–V and villages of Kluk, Polabec, Přední Lhota and Velké Zboží.

Etymology
An ancient community and a small fortress originated near the ford. It is most likely that the position of this community is reflected in the present name of the town: pode brody = "below the ford".

Geography
It lies in the Central Elbe Table lowland within the Polabí region. The Elbe River flows through the town.

South of the town is located Poděbrady Lake. It is a  large lake, created by the flooding of an excavated sandstone quarry. It is mainly used for recreational purposes.

History

The first written mention of Poděbrady is from 1223, the first unverified mention is from 1199. A long-distance trade route running from Prague to eastern Bohemia and then on to Silesia and Poland passed through the then-forested landscape interwoven with a dense network of river branches. This important communication intersected the Elbe River to the west of the present town, at a place called Na Vinici. The Poděbrady estate was private, but between 1262 and 1268, it became the property of King Ottokar II as escheat, and he built a stone water castle in Poděbrady. The place has become a popular destination for rulers due to its proximityto Prague and the possibility of hunting in local forests.

Emperor Charles IV handed over the estate to Lords of Kunštát, who later became known as Lords of Poděbrady. During their presence, Poděbrady achieved its greatest prosperity. In 1472, Poděbrady obtained the town privileges from King George of Poděbrady.

During the reign of Ferdinand I, Poděbrady flourished further, however in the 17th century, the town suffered from Thirty Years' War and fires. The biggest fire hit Poděbrady in 1681, when the town hall and most of the wooden houses completely burned down. After this event, only the construction of brick houses was allowed on the square. The town walls were demolished and the town changed its character in a short time.

A historic milestone of the history of the town was the year 1905, when it was visited by the German estate owner Prince von Bülow. The discovery of carbonic mineral water resulted in the opening of the first spa in 1908. After World War I Poděbrady rapidly changed into a spa town which from 1926 specialized in the treatment of cardiovascular diseases, rapidly gaining renown not only in the Czech Republic, but also abroad.

Demographics

Spa
The mineral water that was found in the early 1900s is better known as Poděbradka. The water contains iron deposits. There are twelve free public taps where people are able to obtain Poděbradka. The refined version of Poděbradka that is not as heavy is bottled and headed to shops in the whole country.

Lázně Poděbrady, a. s. (Spa Poděbrady, Inc.) is a Czech spa provider in Poděbrady. The spa is focused mainly on the treatment of heart problems and the musculoskeletal system.

Transport
The D11 motorway runs south of the town.

An important railroad from Prague to Lysá nad Labem and Kolín crosses here at a railway station.

Sights

The historic centre is made up of Jiřího Square and its surroundings. The main landmark is Poděbrady Castle. It was rebuilt to its current form in 1752–1757 at the behest of Maria Theresa. Today it serves as a museum and monument of George of Poděbrady.

The square is made up of terraced houses of Renaissance and Baroque origin and former Renaissance town hall from the 16th century, nowadays a library. The Neo-Renaissance building of the Civic Bank from 1898 is also valuable. The Baroque Marian column dates from 1765. A significant element of the square is the Monument of King George from 1896 with his equestrian statue.

The large spa park with a modern colonnade is also a part of the urban monument zone. The oldest part of the park was created on the site of a former manor park according to the project of architect František Janda. Gradually, more parts were added and the park expanded. The glass colonnade of Professor Libenský was built in 1938. The colonnade was built above a spring of mineral water.

The most valuable technical monument is the Poděbrady hydroelectric power plant. It is a Neoclassical building designed by Antonín Engel in 1913, built in 1914–1919. It is valued for still functional technology and its architectural solution. It is one of the oldest locks in the Middle Elbe and at the same time a valuable example of technological and operational solutions for this type of waterworks.

Notable people
George of Poděbrady (1420–1471), King of Bohemia
Kunigunde of Sternberg (1425–1449), wife of George of Poděbrady; buried here
Ludvík Kuba (1853–1956), painter, musician and writer
Jan Trampota (1889–1942), painter; died here
Josef and Ctirad Mašín, resistance fighters; attended a high school here
Miloš Forman (1932–2018), filmmaker
Václav Havel (1936–2011), first president of the Czech Republic
Hans Janowitz (1890–1954), German author
Marta Kubišová (born 1942), singer and signatory to Charter 77

Twin towns – sister cities

Poděbrady is twinned with:

 Netanya, Israel
 Piešťany, Slovakia
 Tharandt, Germany
 Vertou, France

Gallery

See also
CDE Podebrady

References

External links

Poděbrady Spa
Culture in Poděbrady

Cities and towns in the Czech Republic
Populated places in Nymburk District
Spa towns in the Czech Republic